Acacia Crest Academy is a learning institution that is located in Kitengela, Kenya. It was opened in the year 2001 by Mr. & Mrs. Maina after 12 months of construction. It is located 5 km from Kitengela town on tarmac and 3 km off tarmac road i.e. 8 km from Kitengela town. The school started from baby class up to class 4 initially and as a day school. Later on boarding facilities were put up to cater for class 5 to 8 pupils, since they required a lot of teacher-pupil contact hours. It is a Christian school in faith and this is the foundation of its morals. It currently celebrated its 16th Anniversary last year. It is a member of the Kenya Private Schools Association (KPSA) in which the class eights every year sit for the Kenya Certificate of Primary Education (KCPE). The first KCPE sat for by the candidates was in the year 2005 where the first student got an outstanding 435 marks out of 500.

History

Beginning of the school
Before the couple thought of building the school in that place, most of Kitengela was nothing but a bushy grassland. It is by great hope and non-despair they started constructing the school. Kitengela was not a Nairobi Metropolitan like it is today. It has grown rapidly in the past several years and has been cited as one of the fastest-growing towns in Kenya. For the first days after the school was set up, Catherine Maina (mostly called Mrs Maina) experienced a very hard and rough time. Most of the pioneer parents were removing their children since they didn't want them to be the first ones in the school. For instance, in 2002, the then class two only held two students.

Dormitories
Initially, there was only one dormitory which consisted of only two girls and one boy. The boy, who was known as Adams slept all alone as the girls who were sisters slept at the upper storey. There was only one matron who went around making sure everything was right. Soon after, the school began admitting more and more pupils into the "dorms". They were then forced to build more dorms and to date, it consists of four major dorms, two for girls and two for boys. The ones for the boys are namely,"Mara Dorm" which was the initial and oldest dorm and "Samburu Dorm" which was built later on.
For the girls, there is "Amboseli Dorm" and "Tsavo Dorm". There are now four matrons along with the boarding master, who is called Mr Edward(he is also known as Chief Justice since he deals with cases that affect the school). He is also the games teacher and began working for the school since inception.

Boarding department
The school has a boarding department in which over 200 pupils are hosted in school to study and to sleep in the dormitories available.

The dining hall that is not far away from the classes is used for various activities on different days. In the every-day schedule, it is used for meals. On special days such as Sundays, it is converted into a Church where the preacher gives out the word of God. On other occasions, (usually the day before closing day), it is converted into a cinema hall.

Other progress
The school participates in Drama and Music festivals up to Provincial level and offers other subjects like French, Computer, Music, Educational trips and swimming. The students engage in a lot of outside sports competitions as well for exposure and to test their skills.

Examination progress
Acacia Crest Academy did its first KCPE in the year 2005 attaining a mean score of 385.2, and took position 49 nationally. Year 2006 a mean score of 378.6 marks and took position 62 nationally and 2007 with a mean score of 381.86 took position 60 nationally and number 10 in Rift valley Province. 2008 mean score of 381.88 and position 3 in Kajiado district. Here is a table of the performance since then.

Educational institutions established in 2001
Education in Rift Valley Province
2001 establishments in Kenya